is a Japanese mobile phone operator. The name is officially an abbreviation of the phrase, "do communications over the mobile network", and is also from a compound word dokomo, meaning "everywhere" in Japanese. Docomo provides phone, video phone (FOMA and Some PHS), i-mode (internet), and mail (i-mode mail, Short Mail, and SMS) services. The company's headquarters are in the Sanno Park Tower, Nagatachō, Chiyoda, Tokyo. NTT Docomo is the largest wireless carrier in Japan, with 82.632 million subscribers as of March 2021.

Docomo had been spun off from Nippon Telegraph and Telephone (NTT) in August 1991 to take over the mobile cellular operations, although the parent company had the majority stake until the re-privatization in 2020. It provides 2G (mova) PDC cellular services, 3G (FOMA) W-CDMA, 4G LTE and 5G NR services. Its businesses also included PHS (Paldio), paging, and satellite. Docomo ceased offering a PHS service on January 7, 2008. In late 2020, Docomo was bought back by NTT for about $40 billion.

Customers 
NTT Docomo is a subsidiary of Japan's incumbent telephone operator, NTT. The majority of NTT Docomo's shares are owned by NTT (which is 33.71% government-owned). While some NTT shares are publicly traded, control of the company by Japanese interests (government and civilian) is guaranteed by the number of shares available to buyers. It provides wireless voice and data communications to subscribers in Japan. NTT Docomo is the creator of W-CDMA technology as well as mobile i-mode service.

NTT Docomo had over 53 million customers (as of March 2008), which is more than half of Japan's cellular market. The company provides a wide variety of mobile multimedia services. These include i-mode which provides e-mail and internet access to over 50 million subscribers, FOMA, which was launched in 2001 as the world's first 3G mobile service based on W-CDMA, Xi, a 4G LTE mobile service which was launched on December 24, 2010, Premium 4G, a LTE Advanced service which was launched on March 27, 2015, and DoCoMo 5G, a 5G NR service which launched on March 25, 2020.

In addition to wholly owned subsidiaries in Europe and North America, the company is expanding its global reach through strategic alliances with mobile and multimedia service providers in Asia-Pacific and Europe. NTT Docomo is listed on the Tokyo (9437), London (NDCM), and New York (DCM) stock exchanges.

On April 19, 2008, it was announced that Ryuji Yamada, the current co-president of NTT Docomo, will be promoted as the president of NTT Docomo in June 2008. Masao Nakamura will stay in NTT Docomo as a director and also the senior adviser. Since October 2006, when the introduction to the service which allows the user to carry their original phone number with a new provider was made, NTT Docomo has lost many users to KDDI and SoftBank. This promotion was made in order to get more users for NTT Docomo. The company was the last major global mobile carrier to offer Apple's iPhone, which it finally did with the release of the iPhone 5s and 5c. This has been cited as one of the reasons for the steady stream of its customers switching for competing networks.

In June 2011, the company announced that they were teaming up with McAfee to provide McAfee VirusScan Mobile for its Android mobile users. In July 2012, NTT Docomo acquired Italy's Buongiorno in a deal worth 209 million euros.

Research and development 

In October 2007, the prototype Wellness mobile phone of Japan's NTT Docomo Inc. and Mitsubishi Electric Corp. was launched at CEATEC. It checks health with a motion sensor that detects body movement and measures calories, and includes a breathalyzer.

On January 24, 2008, NTT Docomo announced a partnership with Google, which allowed all models after the FOMA904i models to view YouTube videos.

In May 2017, NTT Docomo launched 5G trial networks at Aomi, Odaiba (Tokyo Waterfront City) and the area around Tokyo Skytree. NTT Docomo commercially launched its 5G network on March 25, 2020, the first Japanese operator to do so, and making Japan among the first countries in the world to launch 5G.

NTT Docomo was a founding member of the Symbian Foundation.

In August 2021, NTT DOCOMO and Airbus demonstrated a solar-powered Zephyr High Altitude Platform Station (HAPS) for wireless connectivity to evaluate the application of HAPS for use in 5G evolution and 6G usage. The trial took place in the United States over 18 days conducting flights in the stratosphere and transmitting data at various speeds up to a distance of 140km. If the communications system is considered feasible, then NTT DOCOMO and Airbus would be able to provide communication services to remote islands, mountainous areas, and to remote sea lanes.

Earthquake warning system 
From 2008, Docomo began offering a service called the "Area Mail Disaster Information Service" which broadcasts Earthquake Early Warning messages produced by the Japan Meteorological Agency to its subscribers with compatible handsets. This service is provided free of charge and messages are limited to those areas affected by each particular alert. These alerts have a unique ring tone so they can be easily distinguished from incoming calls or messages.

Civil protection system 
From 2014, under Civil Protection Law of Japan, Docomo began offering a service called the "Area Mail Disaster and Evacuation Information Service" which broadcasts J-Alert messages (including Earthquake Early Warning) produced by the Japan Fire and Disaster Management Agency to its subscribers with compatible handsets (e.g. Sony XPERIA,  iPhone 5s, Samsung Galaxy).

The message is broadcast when threats are imminent (e.g. North Korea's ballistic missile launching, terrorist attack to nuclear power plant, volcanic eruptions, or  an approaching tsunami.)

Mascot 

The company's mascot is Docomodake, a mushroom, which is quite a celebrity in Japan. He is even the hero of a Nintendo DS puzzle and platforming video game, Boing! Docomodake DS on 2007 and 2009; on 2016 or 2015, Nintendo put a Docomodake Mii in the app they called Miitomo, which was also released in North America, Japan and Europe. He also has a wide variety of merchandising such as cell phone straps, keychains, and plush dolls. As one type of advertising method, there are many types of Docomodakes such as mother and father, which symbolizes the plans that NTT Docomo offers.

Emoji

Shigetaka Kurita, who was part of the team working on NTT DoCoMo's i-mode mobile Internet platform, that has been credited as the first creator of emoji. This has since been corrected. In fact, SoftBank released their emoji set on the DP-211SW mobile phone in 1997. 

Copyright ownership of an emoji typically belongs to the company or organization that created it. For example, the copyright for Apple's emoji designs belongs to Apple Inc. Similarly, the copyright for emoji used on platforms such as Facebook, Twitter, and WhatsApp belong to the respective companies.

It's worth noting that emoji are standardized through the Unicode Consortium, which sets standards for how emoji should look and what they should represent. However, individual companies and platforms can still design their own variations of emoji within those standards.

Investments outside Japan 

NTT Docomo has a wide range of foreign investments. However, NTT Docomo was not successful in investing in foreign carriers. Docomo had invested very large multibillion-dollar amounts in KPN, KT Freetel, AT&T Wireless, and had to write-off sell all these investments in foreign carriers. As a result, Docomo booked a total of about US$10 billion in losses, while during the same time Docomo's Japan operations were profitable.

In December 2007, NTT Docomo and KT Freetel jointly invested US$200 million for a total of 33% stake in U Mobile Malaysia.

In June 2008 NTT Docomo joined the non-profit Symbian Foundation led by Nokia to co-develop a new Symbian smartphone operating system based on the S60 platform, which resulted in Symbian^2 for the Japanese market.

In December 2006 they acquired Guamcell, the largest phone company in Guam, and changed its name to DOCOMO PACIFIC.

Docomo is working on implementing its FeliCa-based payment system, called iD, overseas. It has already launched the system in Guam, as well as Shanghai and Beijing, China (however, as of November 2010, it has withdrawn iD terminals from all merchants in China).

Docomo Capital 
Working closely with NTT Docomo's business and R&D divisions, Docomo Capital is in charge of NTT Docomo's venture investments in mobile related start-up companies, mainly in the United States and has committed $100M in capital. It has invested in Cooliris, Couchbase, Evernote, Fab.com, HighlightCam, Swype, TuneWiki, Sigfox and Wiliot.

Docomo Digital 
Docomo Digital is the international payments business of NTT DOCOMO. DOCOMO Digital partners with carriers, merchants, OTT services, app stores and payment providers in both developed and emerging markets to facilitate direct carrier billing and other payments such as e-wallets.  Sold to Bango plc August 2022.

Hikari TV 
 is a Japanese IPTV service. It was established on March 31, 2008 and was originally owned and operated by the internet service provider NTT Plala. It launched Hikari TV Game, the first cloud gaming service for televisions in Japan, in 2013.

On July 1, 2022, NTT Docomo absorbed and merged the operating company NTT Plala, and on the same day, this service was also incorporated into NTT DoCoMo's service. Along with this, the rate plan for new subscribers was changed after the same day.

Various Problems and Scandals

Problems with installation and construction of base stations 
In June 2005, OsakaIkeda City, base station construction began without the required notification and destroyed the Furue Tomb.
In June 2006, it was discovered that a base station installed in Arashiyama, Kyoto in 1999 had not been notified in advance under the Cultural Heritage Protection Law.
In June 2008, it was discovered that a base station in the Hirao district of Nagashima-cho, Izumi County, Kagoshima Prefecture, had been installed without a permit in Unzen Amakusa National Park in 2006.
Both of these base stations were removed or relocated after the problem was discovered.

See also 

 Japanese mobile phone culture
 NTT Docomo USA
 List of telephone operating companies

Notes

References 

 FY2007 Annual Report. NTT Docomo, Inc., June 12, 2008.
 Ito, Takayuki (2006). "Japanese Cellular Phones FAQ". euc.JP. August 6, 2006.
 Docomo corporate information

External links 

 

 
Nippon Telegraph and Telephone
Internet service providers of Japan
Mobile phone companies of Japan
Telecommunications companies based in Tokyo
Service companies based in Tokyo
Telecommunications companies established in 1991
Japanese companies established in 1991
Members of the Conexus Mobile Alliance
Japanese brands
1998 initial public offerings